is a railway station in the town of Hiraizumi, Iwate, Japan, operated by East Japan Railway Company (JR East).

Lines
Hiraizumi Station is served by the Tōhoku Main Line, and is located 452.3 rail kilometers from the terminus of the line at Tokyo Station.

Station layout
The station has two opposed side platforms connected to the station building by a footbridge.  The station has a Midori no Madoguchi staffed ticket office.

Platforms

History
Hiraizumi Station opened on 25 May 1898. The present station building was completed in 1966. The station was absorbed into the JR East network upon the privatization of the Japanese National Railways (JNR) on 1 April 1987.

Passenger statistics
In fiscal 2018, the station was used by an average of 437 passengers daily (boarding passengers only).

Surrounding area
Chūson-ji
Mōtsū-ji
Hiraizumi Post Office
Hiraizumi tourist information
Hiraizumi Town Hall

Bus terminal

Highway buses 
 For Sendai Station (Higashi Nippon Express)
 Ihatov; For Ōmiya Station, Kawaguchi Station, Akabane Station, and Ikebukuro Station (Iwateken Kotsu)

See also
 List of Railway Stations in Japan

References

External links

  

Railway stations in Iwate Prefecture
Tōhoku Main Line
Railway stations in Japan opened in 1898
Hiraizumi, Iwate
Stations of East Japan Railway Company